USS Gallup (PGM-85/PG-85) was an  acquired by the United States Navy for the task of high speed patrolling in shallow waterways.

The third U.S. Navy ship to be named Gallup and the second to be named for Gallup, New Mexico, was laid down 27 April 1964 by Tacoma Boatbuilding Company, Inc., Tacoma, Washington; launched 15 June 1965; sponsored by Mrs. Goodwin Chase; and commissioned 22 October 1966.

Pacific Ocean operations 
 
From October 1966 until February 1967, the motor gunboat conducted shakedown operations under Commander Amphibious Group 3 off the U.S. West Coast as far north as Juan de Fuca. On 28 March 1967 Gallup was reclassified PG-85. She served as a patrol and surveillance craft in the U.S. Pacific Fleet.

Vietnam War operations 

Gallup served in Vietnam while the war continued. Afterwards, she patrolled the Trust Territories of the Pacific.

Decommissioning 

Gallup was decommissioned 31 January 1977 and struck from the Navy Directory on 9 October 1984. She was eventually scrapped in 2007.

References

External links 

 NavSource Online: Motor Gunboat / Patrol Gunboat Photo Archive – Gallup (PG 85) – ex-PGM-85
 

Asheville-class gunboats
Cold War patrol vessels of the United States
Vietnam War patrol vessels of the United States
Ships built by Tacoma Boatbuilding Company
Patrol vessels of the United States Navy
USS Gallup (PGM-85)
1965 ships